Javier Caceres (born 8 September 1939) is a Peruvian footballer. He competed in the men's tournament at the 1960 Summer Olympics.

References

External links
 
 

1939 births
Living people
Peruvian footballers
Peru international footballers
Olympic footballers of Peru
Footballers at the 1960 Summer Olympics
Sportspeople from Callao
Association football forwards
Sport Boys footballers